Dunlap is an unincorporated community in Fresno County, California. It has a population of 131. In the 1800s Dunlap was a rest stop for passengers of the stage coach and a location for a change of horses.

St. Nicholas Ranch, a conference and retreat center run by the Greek Orthodox Church, is a major attraction. The Greek Orthodox Monastery (Convent) of the Theotokos, the Life-Giving Spring is also located there. Prior to the acquisition of the land by the ranch and the monastery, the land was known as the Sally K Ranch with two of the old ranch dwellings now being occupied by the ranch manager and assigned clergy. On the ranch property itself, there is an old barn, totally constructed of redwood, with a chapel inside (on the second floor). Referred to as "The Barn Church" or "St. Nicolas Chapel" by locals, the chapel has a minimalist design, and is home to a colony of bats. The extremely large barn itself was built in 1891 to house livestock, with the chapel being a much more recent addition. In the late 1800s the large barn was also used to store ice for the city of Fresno; the ice was cut in the winter, reportedly at nearby Hume Lake, and then the large blocks were moved to the barn. Although the barn is no longer used for livestock, the original enclosures are still there.

An attraction near to Dunlap on Highway 180 is the Sierra Endangered Cat Haven. The ZIP Code is 93621, and the community is inside area code 559.

The first post office was established in 1882, was closed for a time in 1885, and moved in 1898. The name honors George Dunlap Moss, a school teacher instrumental in bringing a post office to the town.

Hye Camp, which was formerly owned by Olympian Bob Mathias, is now owned and operated by the Armenian Church of the Western Diocese as a youth camp and retreat center.

A female intern-volunteer was killed on March 6, 2013 by a lion at the Sierra Endangered Cat Haven animal park. The lion escaped from a feeding cage and attacked while she was cleaning his enclosure.

Climate
The Köppen Climate Classification subtype for this climate is "Csb" (Mediterranean Climate).

References

Further reading

Oak to Pine to Timberline: Tale of Settlers and Sinners South of the Kings (1985), Helen Clingan and Forest Clingan.

Unincorporated communities in California
Unincorporated communities in Fresno County, California
Mono tribe
Populated places established in 1882